Don't Worry Darling is a 2022 American psychological thriller film directed by Olivia Wilde from a screenplay by Katie Silberman, based on a spec script by Carey Van Dyke, Shane Van Dyke, and Silberman. The film stars Florence Pugh, Harry Styles, Wilde, Gemma Chan, KiKi Layne, Nick Kroll, and Chris Pine. The film follows an idyllic housewife living in a company town who begins to suspect a sinister secret being kept from its residents by the man who runs it.

Following the critical success of Wilde's feature directorial debut Booksmart (2019), a multi-studio bidding war took place for the rights of her second film, with New Line Cinema eventually winning. Pugh joined the cast in April 2020, with Styles being added that September, replacing Shia LaBeouf. Filming began in Los Angeles in October 2020, lasting through February 2021. The film was the subject of media attention and controversy, including conflicting reports regarding the circumstances of LaBeouf's departure and alleged conflicts between Wilde and Pugh.

Don't Worry Darling premiered at the 79th Venice International Film Festival on September 5, 2022, and was theatrically released in the United States on September 23, by Warner Bros. Pictures. It received mixed reviews from critics who praised Pugh's performance, the cinematography, and production design, but criticized the screenplay and direction, and noted similarities to other works in the genre such as The Stepford Wives (1975) and Get Out (2017). The film was a commercial success, grossing $87 million on a budget of $35 million.

Plot
At an unspecified time, Alice and Jack Chambers live in the idyllic late 1950s-early 1960s-styled company town of Victory, California. Every day, the men leave for work at Victory Headquarters in the surrounding desert, while their wives are discouraged from asking about their husbands' work or leaving the safety of town. Alice's friend Margaret has become an outcast after taking her son into the desert, resulting in his apparent death, although she claims Victory took him from her as punishment. At a party hosted by Victory's enigmatic founder Frank, Alice sees Margaret's husband attempt to give her medication after an outburst. As Alice and Jack engage in a sex act in Frank's bedroom, she notices Frank watching.

Riding the trolley across town, Alice sees a plane crash in the desert and rushes to help. She stumbles onto Headquarters and touches one of its mirror-like windows, experiencing surreal hallucinations before waking up at home that night. In the following days, she experiences increasingly strange occurrences, and receives a phone call from Margaret, who claims to have seen the same thing. After rebuffing her, Alice witnesses Margaret slit her own throat and fall from her roof. Before she can reach Margaret's body, Alice is dragged away by men in red jumpsuits who are working for Frank.

Jack dismisses Alice's claims and says Margaret is simply recovering from a household accident, corroborated by the town physician, Dr. Collins. He prescribes medication for Alice, which Jack declines, and she steals Margaret's heavily redacted medical file from his briefcase. Alice becomes increasingly paranoid, and during a company celebration where Frank gives Jack a special promotion, she breaks down in the bathroom. Comforted by her friend Bunny, Alice attempts to explain everything but Bunny reacts angrily, accusing Alice of jeopardizing Victory.

Alice and Jack invite their friends to dinner, with Frank and his wife Shelley as special guests. In private, Frank confirms Alice's suspicions and says he hopes she continues to challenge him. Spurred by his confession, she attempts to expose him over dinner, but Frank gaslights her, making her seem delusional to the other guests. In the aftermath, Alice begs Jack to leave Victory, but he instead has her taken away by Frank's men. Dr. Collins forces Alice to undergo electroshock therapy, during which she sees visions of herself in the present-day, struggling to make ends meet as a surgeon and living with the unemployed and disgruntled Jack.

In Victory, Alice is welcomed home and resumes her normal life, but comes to realize the visions are her real memories, and Jack admits the truth: Victory is a simulated world created by Frank, where Jack and the other men lead their version of perfect lives; the women they have forced into the simulation are unaware that their lives, children, and Victory itself do not exist. Jack argues that Alice was miserable with their real lives and now they can both be happy, but she is furious he effectively imprisoned her. Jack begs for forgiveness, forcefully holding on to Alice until she fatally strikes him with a rocks glass, killing both his simulated and real selves.

Frank is alerted to Jack's death, while Bunny finds Alice and explains that she has always known Victory was a simulation, but chose to stay to be with her children, who died in real life. She tells Alice to drive to Headquarters, the exit portal from the simulation, and Alice silently confronts the neighborhood, leading the other wives to realize something is wrong as their husbands panic. Fleeing in Jack's car, Alice is chased by Dr. Collins and Frank's men, and tricks them into crashing into each other. At home, Shelley fatally stabs Frank to take control of Victory for her own ends. Arriving at Headquarters, Alice has a final vision of Jack, but rushes to the window and puts her hand on the window's glass as Frank's men reach her, seeing disturbing images mixed with some visions of herself in real world. After that, the screen cuts black and Alice is heard gasping for air.

Cast

Production

Development and writing

The film was announced in August 2019, after a bidding war amongst 18 studios to acquire the next Olivia Wilde-directed project. New Line Cinema won the auction. The original spec script was written by brothers Carey and Shane Van Dyke; the screenplay appeared on the 2019 Black List. Katie Silberman was brought on to do a rewrite which became the film's screenplay. According to Wilde, the sinister character Frank was inspired by psychologist and author Jordan Peterson, whom she described as a "pseudo-intellectual hero to the incel community".

Casting
In April 2020, Florence Pugh, Shia LaBeouf and Chris Pine were added to the cast of the film, with Dakota Johnson joining the next month. Wilde was originally set to play Pugh's part and Pugh was to play Wilde's, but they traded roles when Wilde decided she wanted a younger couple at the center of the film. In September 2020, Harry Styles joined the cast, replacing LaBeouf.

In October 2020, Gemma Chan and KiKi Layne joined the cast, with Layne replacing Johnson, who dropped out due to a scheduling conflict with The Lost Daughter (2021). That month, Sydney Chandler, Nick Kroll, Douglas Smith, Kate Berlant, Asif Ali, Timothy Simons and Ari'el Stachel joined the cast.

Filming

Principal photography began in Los Angeles on October 26, 2020. It was temporarily halted for two weeks on November 4 after a crew member tested positive for COVID-19, which resulted in stars Pugh, Styles and Pine being quarantined. Filming wrapped on February 13, 2021. The film's original score was composed by John Powell.

The opening sequence was filmed at the Kaufmann House. It was the first film to be shot there. Wilde was inspired by its architecture, and hung a photograph of it on her wall while working on the script. She told Variety, "To be there was huge. To direct the first shot there felt like this really auspicious beginning to this movie which was this love letter not only to film, but to architecture, to design, to this era."

Alleged conflicts on set
Labeouf

In 2021, it was reported that LaBeouf had been fired by Wilde over poor behavior and clashing with the cast and crew. LaBeouf initially denied these claims in August 2022, stating that he quit the film despite Wilde's efforts to keep him on board. He provided Variety with leaked texts and a video recording from Wilde addressed to him, in which she says

Following LaBeouf's statements, Wilde denied his claims and stated once again that she fired him, telling Vanity Fair that she fired him after Pugh said she was uncomfortable with LaBeouf's behavior. When asked about this in an interview with the Hollywood Reporter, LaBeouf replied, "It is what it is."

Wilde and Pugh

Unsubstantiated and solidly countered tabloid rumors alleged Wilde and Pugh to have clashed on set, leading to tensions during both production and promotion for the film. An anonymous source reported to Vulture that Pugh and Wilde had a "screaming match" on set, and the Warner Bros. executive Toby Emmerich oversaw a "long negotiation process" between Wilde, Pugh and the studio to figure out how much Pugh would continue to be involved in the film. Warner Bros. co-chairs and CEOs Michael De Luca and Pam Abdy denied any tension between themselves and Olivia Wilde, stating, "We are so proud of the work that Olivia Wilde has done making this incredibly beautiful and entertaining film and look forward to collaborating with her again." On September 25, 2022, 40 members of the film's crew issued a statement disputing the allegations and dismissing rumors of unprofessional behavior on the set as "completely untrue." The allegations have also been dismissed by cinematographer Matthew Libatique, who called the set "one of the most harmonious sets I've ever been on", and by Wilde herself, who called the rumors "baseless."

On September 13, Vice spoke with the organization Media Matters about the increase in negative coverage and activity on social media surrounding the movie and Wilde herself. Media Matters found that in the previous week, "right-leaning pages ha[d] posted over 300 times about Wilde and the movie, earning over 200,000 interactions." In both Vice and Letterboxd's fandom correspondent, Sacha Judd, speculated that Wilde's treatment was largely due to sexism. Judd claimed that much of the hate towards and rumors about Wilde and her film originated years previously in niche, often conspiratorial circles of her then-boyfriend Harry Styles' fandom. This is supported by a May 2022 report  in Input Magazine, which said that these fans "circulated and mocked unflattering pictures of Styles' current girlfriend, Olivia Wilde, [on TikTok] and have called for fellow fans to jump on the "Olivia Wilde hate train." Judd accused trades that were reporting on Don't Worry Darling alleged drama of "credulously republishing" untrue information "seemingly without any scrutiny at all."

Marketing
At the CinemaCon 2022 for the stage at Caesars Palace, Wilde confirmed that the idea of the film was inspired by Inception, The Matrix, and The Truman Show. The trailer, which was also shown at CinemaCon, was released online on May 2, 2022. A teaser poster was released on June 16, 2022, and a second trailer was released on July 21, 2022.

David Christopherson of MovieWeb called the poster "unsettling" and writing on the trailer, Valerie Ettenhofer of /Film said Don't Worry Darling looks like a "full-blown horror movie", noting the mystery surrounding its plot and The Stepford Wives overtones. The official release poster was released on August 11, 2022. An edited version of the second trailer was shown in theaters and was released online on September 21, 2022.

Release
Don't Worry Darling had its world premiere at the 79th Venice International Film Festival on September 5, 2022. Claims of Styles spitting on Pine during the Venice premiere based on videos recorded from inside the theatre (and thereby adding to the already rocky press tour mired by allegations of a falling-out between Wilde and Pugh) were dismissed as "a ridiculous story" and "a complete fabrication" by Pine's representative. The film also screened at the 48th Deauville American Film Festival and the 70th San Sebastián International Film Festival. It was theatrically released on September 23, 2022.

The film was released for VOD on October 25, 2022 and was released on Ultra HD Blu-ray, Blu-ray  DVD on November 29, 2022. It began streaming to subscribers on HBO Max on November 7, 2022. Over it first week of streaming, it was watched in 2.7 million households.

Reception

Box office
Don't Worry Darling grossed $45.3 million in the United States and Canada, and $42.1 million in other territories, for a worldwide total of $87.4 million.

In the United States and Canada, Don't Worry Darling was projected to gross $17–20 million from 4,113 theaters in its opening weekend, with some estimates going as high as $25 million. The film made $9.4 million on its first day, including a combined $3.1 million from preview screenings on Monday and Thursday. It went on to debut to $19.4 million, topping the box office; 66% of the audience female, with nearly 70% between the ages 18–34. Several publications noted the film was front-loaded to Friday and previews, attributing it likely to younger women going out to see Styles in the film. In its sophomore weekend the film fell 64.6% to $6.8 million, finishing second behind newcomer Smile.

Critical response
On the review aggregator website Rotten Tomatoes, the film has an approval rating of 38% based on 341 reviews, with an average rating of 5.5/10. The website's critics consensus reads, "Despite an intriguing array of talent on either side of the camera, Don't Worry Darling is a mostly muddled rehash of overly familiar themes." Metacritic gave the film a weighted average score of 48 out of 100 based on 62 critics, indicating "mixed or average reviews". Audiences polled by CinemaScore gave the film an average grade of "B–" on an A+ to F scale, while those at PostTrak gave the film a 67% overall positive score, with 53% saying they would definitely recommend it.

Critics praised Pugh's performance, the cinematography, and the visual style, but found the overall film to be unsatisfying. Rotten Tomatoes reported that Styles had "a debatably entertaining turn" and that reaction to the third act was divided. Reviewing the film following its Venice premiere, Kate Erbland of IndieWire praised the scenography and cast performances, particularly Pugh's, but found fault with the screenplay, summarizing: "Pugh's outstanding performance and the extraordinary below-the-line craftsmanship are all impeccably rendered, but they can't overcome the film's rotten core concept." In a mixed review for The A.V. Club, Tomris Laffly commended Pugh's performance and also had positive words regarding Pine's performance and the film's visuals, but named Styles as "outmatched" and criticized the direction and found its handling of themes and ideas heavy-handed, writing "Perhaps the chief deficit of Don't Worry Darling isn't even predictability, but a discernible lack of new ideas of its own." The Guardians Peter Bradshaw called it a "movie marooned in a desert of unoriginality", criticizing the screenplay and direction. Vulture.coms Bilge Ebiri described the film as "smooth, competent, (mostly) well acted, and merely tedious" although he did feel as if the plot "can get boring and repetitive after a little while". Complimenting the performances of Pugh, Wilde, and Pine, he named Styles as "the weak link ... who is not without talent but who fails to give Jack the dimensionality or inner conflict the character clearly needs." Phil de Semlyn of Time Out opined that "Pugh saves this stylish but inert horror-thriller from disaster", with Richard Lawson of Vanity Fair echoing these statements, describing Pugh "a commanding and centered actor who makes the most of the hash she's served". Writing for the independent online publication Clapper, Ewan Gleadow praised Pugh's performance but ultimately concluded that the film "just isn't up to scratch".

Anthony Lane of The New Yorker named Pine "the best thing in the film" and described Styles as "utterly and helplessly adrift" while reading lines of dialogue. Geoffrey Macnab of The Independent also criticized Styles' performance in the film, stating "Styles gives a surprisingly dull and low-wattage performance as Jack." He further wrote that the film "is beautifully shot by cinematographer Matthew Libatique" while also complimenting the visuals. Steph Green's review of the film for BBC wrote that the film is "full of half-baked ideas" and "an empty shell" while also noting the film's repetitive nature. She wrote that "Pugh does her best with the material" but that "Styles doesn't feel up to the material here, with leaden line delivery and a lack of light and shade making his scenes opposite Pugh fall flat." Writing for Time magazine, Stephanie Zacharek opined that "the plot is cleverly worked out" and complimented Pugh's performance, but disliked the film's ending and wrote that "Styles is cute, but a dud. Everything he does on-screen practically evaporates from one scene to the next." Scott Mendelson of Forbes named Pugh's performance "as good as you'd expect", complimented Pine as he "relishes the chance to play a smarmy villain", and argued that "Styles is as good as he needs to be" and that "some of the criticism of his performance has been more about the character than the actor." Michael Shindler of The American Spectator while noting the film does not suffer on account of cast performances, argued that based on Wilde's statements and reports of on-set developments, that the film rather than being "a mere swing and a miss" could be construed as an exercise in unintentional self-criticism. Helen O'Hara of Empire complimented the cinematography and described Styles' performance as "solid" while particularly praising Pugh, naming her performance "flawless" and opining "this is her film, and everyone else is just there for support." Pete Hammond of Deadline wrote that the film is "quite entertaining" and "kinda fun", while writing that Styles "shows he is the real deal as an actor and has great promise" while also complimenting the performances of Pugh and Pine. Owen Gleiberman of Variety complimented the production design and opined that Pugh "holds downs the center of the movie" and that Jack is "played by Styles with a wholesome cunning that marks him as a natural screen actor" and that "with his popping eyes, floppy shock of hair, and saturnine suaveness, he recalls the young Frank Sinatra as an actor." Jordan Peterson, on learning he inspired the character of Frank, rejected the characterization, calling Don't Worry Darling "the latest bit of propaganda disseminated by the woke, self-righteous bores and bullies who now dominate Hollywood."

Notes

References

External links
 
 

2022 films
2022 psychological thriller films
2022 thriller drama films
2020s American films
2020s English-language films
2020s feminist films
2020s mystery drama films
2020s mystery thriller films
American feminist films
American mystery drama films
American mystery thriller films
American psychological thriller films
American thriller drama films
Casting controversies in film
Film controversies in the United States
Film productions suspended due to the COVID-19 pandemic
Films about domestic violence
Films about marriage
Films about simulated reality
Films about suicide
Films directed by Olivia Wilde
Films produced by Roy Lee
Films scored by John Powell
Films set in California
Films shot in Los Angeles
Films shot in Palm Springs, California
Films with screenplays by Katie Silberman
IMAX films
New Line Cinema films
Utopian films
Vertigo Entertainment films
Warner Bros. films